Marconi's law is the relation between length of antennas and maximum signaling distance of radio transmissions. Guglielmo Marconi enunciated at one time an empirical law that, for simple vertical sending and receiving antennas of equal height, the maximum working telegraphic distance varied as the square of the height of the antenna. It has been stated that the rule was tested in experiments made on Salisbury Plain in 1897, and also by experiments made by Italian naval officers on behalf of the Royal Italian Navy in 1900 and 1901. Captain Quintino Bonomo gave a report of these experiments in an official report.

Description

If H is the height (i.e. the length) of the antenna and D the maximum signalling distance, then we have, according to Marconi's law
 ,
where c is some constant.

Marconi's law can be deduced theoretically as follows:

Hertz has shown that distances large compared with its length the magnetic force of a linear oscillator varies inversely as the distance. The maximum value of the current set up in any given receiving antenna varies as its length, also as the magnetic force of the waves incident on it, and as the maximum value of the current in the transmitting antenna.

 and 

Hence 

Also, since for a given charging voltage the current  in the sending antenna varies very nearly as its capacity—that is, as its height—and if the sending antenna has the same height, as the receiving aerial, we have—

But 

Therefore  some constant

For any given receiving apparatus a certain constant minimum value of the maximum current in the receiving antenna is necessary to cause a signal. Therefore it follows that, with given receiving and sending apparatus, we must have  a constant, or—

That is, the maximum signalling distance with given apparatus will vary as the square of the height of the antenna.

The above law is, however, much interfered with by the nature of the surface over which the propagation takes place.

See also
 Arco-Slaby (Telefunken)
 Electrical lengthening
 Radio propagation
 Radio antenna

References 

General
 Fleming, J. A. (1906). The principles of electric wave telegraphy. London: Longmans, Green, and Co. Pg Page 601+.
 Fleming, J. A. (1906). Hertzian wave wireless telegraphy. Pages 42 - 46

Citations

Guglielmo Marconi
Empirical laws
Eponyms
Radio technology